Whitemud Creek is a tributary of the North Saskatchewan River in central Alberta, Canada.

For part of its length, the creek flows through the City of Edmonton, separating neighbourhoods in the Riverbend and Terwillegar Heights areas from other neighbourhoods on the south side of the North Saskatchewan River. Blackmud Creek flows into Whitemud Creek near the northwest corner of the neighborhood of Twin Brooks. For the majority of the creek's area in the city is considered to be a protected area. This also includes other protected areas such as Larch Sanctuary, which is a  reserve south of 23rd avenue which officially opened in the spring of 2017  Whitemud Creek acts as an important wildlife corridor to allow for free movement of species around Edmonton.
Upstream of the river there are various wildlife underpasses as various roads dissect this landscape, this keeps the creek contiguous, the most notable of which is that at the Anthony Henday Drive, where there is space for both animals to travel and pedestrians.

Communities
Edmonton neighbourhoods overlooking Whitemud Creek include:
 Aspen Gardens 
 Blue Quill Estates
 Brookside
 Bulyea Heights
 Chappelle
 Glenridding Ravine
 Grandview Heights
 Graydon Hill
 Hays Ridge
 Hodgson
 Lansdowne
 Ogilvie Ridge
 Magrath Heights
 Westbrook Estates
 Twin Brooks

See also
List of rivers of Alberta

References

 

North Saskatchewan River
Rivers of Alberta
Valleys of Alberta
Landforms of Edmonton